Henry P. Haney (November 25, 1846 - November 19, 1923) was an American last survivor of The Great Locomotive Chase during the American Civil War. He was a 15-year-old fireman on the "Texas", the locomotive used by the "General's" crew to pursue the "General" on the second half of the chase after it was stolen by the Andrews Raiders.

External links 
 

1846 births
1923 deaths
American people in rail transportation
Great Locomotive Chase